"Dimebag" is the fourth episode of third season of the American television drama series The Americans, and the 30th overall episode of the series. It originally aired on February 18, 2015 in the United States on FX.

Plot
After learning their telephone target has employed Kimberly "Kimmy" Breland, daughter of the head of the CIA's Afghan group, as a babysitter, Phillip is tasked with recruiting Kimmy, who is nearly the same age as Paige. He provides fake IDs for Kimmy and her friends, and later she asks to see him alone.  They smoke pot and listen to her favorite album together. Nina is pressured to get a confession from her cellmate, Evi Sneijder, and slowly starts to open up to her. Stan publicly voices his opinion at an EST meeting and is asked out on a date afterward by a woman named Tori; he turns her down flat in spite of Phillip's reminder that "you are single now". Later, Stan confesses his affair to his wife, Sandra, who is upset by his confession. Paige's birthday is approaching and she requests to invite Pastor Tim and his wife to dinner. During the meal, Paige says that she wants to be baptized, and the visitors support her decision. Later, Phillip and Elizabeth think Paige ambushed them with the request and invited her guests for support.

Production
The episode was written by Peter Ackerman and directed by Thomas Schlamme.

Reception

The episode was watched by 972,000 viewers and scored 0.24 ratings in 18-49 demographics, as per Nielsen ratings. It received positive reviews. Erik Adams of The A.V. Club gave the episode a B+ grade. Alan Sepinwall called the episode "great".

References

External links
 "Dimebag" at FX
 

2015 American television episodes
The Americans (season 3) episodes